Guerin High School may refer to:
 Guerin College Preparatory High School
 St. Theodore Guerin High School